Insu may refer to:
İnsu, village in  Yenişehir District, Turkey
Insu-dong, neighbourhood of Gangbuk-gu, Seoul, South Korea
Insu (Korean name), Korean unisex given name
Queen Insu (1437-1504) 

INSU may refer to:
Insituform, British provider of trenchless technologies for gravity and pressure pipelines
Institut national des sciences de l'univers (National Institute for Earth Sciences and Astronomy) of the French Centre national de la recherche scientifique